The Lipotactinae is a small subfamily of Asian bush crickets or katydids; it was originally included with the "Meconematidae".

The two genera can be found in southern China, Indo-China, and Malesia.

Genera 
The Orthoptera species file includes:
 †Eomortoniellus Zeuner, 1936
 Lipotactes Brunner von Wattenwyl, 1898 (China, Indo-China, Malesia)

Note: the previous genus Mortoniellus Griffini, 1909 from Malesia, is now a subgenus of Lipotactes.

References

External links

Tettigoniidae
Orthoptera subfamilies
Orthoptera of Asia